Comet is a historical rich rural town and locality in the Central Highlands Region, Queensland, Australia.

Geography 
Comet is the oldest town in the Emerald area, established at the confluence of the Comet River with the Nogoa River. 

The Central Western railway line enters the locality from the east (Blackwater / Stewarton), passes through the town, and exits to the west (Emerald). The locality is served by the following railway stations (from west to east):

 Yamala railway station
 Comet railway station, serving the town
 Tolmies railway station
 Burngrove railway station
Ensham railway station is in the north of the locality on the Blackwater railway system. It provides rail services to the Ensham coal mines operated by Idemitsu Australia.

The locality has a number of neighbourhoods (from north to south):
 Yamala 
 Leichhardt Tree
 Junction

The area around Comet supports cotton and grain production as well as cattle feedlots.

History
Originally called Cometville, the town takes its name from the Comet River, named by explorer Ludwig Leichhardt who made observations of Comet Wilmot (C/1844 Y2) in the area on 29 December 1844.  

Comet Post Office opened on 5 September 1877.

Cometville State School opened on 23 October 1877. In 1912, it was renamed Comet State School in 1912.

On 19 March 1931, the town's name was changed from Cometville to Comet.

Education 

Comet State School is a government primary (Prep-6) school for boys and girls off the Capricorn Highway. In 2017, the school had an enrolment of 28 students with 5 teachers (3 full-time equivalent) and 4 non-teaching staff (2 full-time equivalent). In 2018, the school had an enrolment of 25 students with 5 teachers (3 full-time equivalent) and 5 non-teaching staff (2 full-time equivalent).

There are no secondary schools in Comet. The closest government secondary school is Emerald State High School in neighbouring Emerald, situated 41 kilometres (25 miles) west of Comet.

Attractions 
Comet is home to a "dig tree" established by Leichhardt to indicate to others where he had buried food and journals.

There is a walking trail through the town visiting points of historic interest.

References

Further reading

External links 

 

Towns in Queensland
Central Highlands Region
Localities in Queensland